Dighton is a city in and the county seat of Lane County, Kansas, United States.  As of the 2020 census, the population of the city was 960.  Dighton is named for Dick Dighton, a surveyor.

History

19th century
The Homestead Act of 1862 offered  of land in the American West, previously owned by railroads, to homesteaders who could live on the land for five years. Drawn west by the promise of free, fertile land, pioneer settlers arrived in Kansas starting in 1869. In 1879, W.A. Watson arrived at the town site, and a post office was established. In 1885, there were three houses and seven voters in town. Lane County became a county in 1886, with Dighton as its county seat. By 1900, the population was 194, and by 1910 it had grown to 370, and the town had banks; a flour mill; a grain elevator; two newspapers; public schools; a hotel; merchants; Baptist, Catholic, and Methodist churches; telegraph service; a band and telephones.

Life was difficult for the early pioneers, who built houses made of sod and found that the land was quite dry, and not as fertile as they had been led to believe. A song written by Frank Baker, the Lane County Bachelor, became a popular folk song throughout the western United States.

20th century
On May 23, 1928, the Fleagle Gang arrived in Dighton after robbing the First National Bank of Lamar, Colorado. Needing medical attention, they kidnapped local doctor W.W. Wineinger, and later shot him and dumped his body into a ravine.

The courtroom mural, "The First House of Lane County," by Mary Alice Bosley, was featured in Kansas Murals: A Traveler's Guide, by Jost and Loewenstein.

Geography
Dighton is located at  (38.481506, -100.464893), at the intersection of K-96 and K-23.

Demographics

2010 census
As of the census of 2010, there were 1,038 people, 506 households, and 282 families residing in the city. The racial makeup of the city was 95.6% White, 0.6% African American, 0.9% Native American, 0.3% Asian, 0.3% from other races, and 2.4% from two or more races. Hispanic or Latino of any race were 3.1% of the population.

There were 506 households, of which 22.5% had children under the age of 18 living with them, 47.0% were married couples living together, 5.5% had a female householder with no husband present, 3.2% had a male householder with no wife present, and 44.3% were non-families. 41.3% of all households were made up of individuals, and 20.4% had someone living alone who was 65 years of age or older. The average household size was 2.05 and the average family size was 2.78.

The median age in the city was 46.2 years. 20.8% of residents were under the age of 18; 6.1% were between the ages of 18 and 24; 22.1% were from 25 to 44; 28.8% were from 45 to 64; and 22.2% were 65 years of age or older. The gender makeup of the city was 48.4% male and 51.6% female.

2000 census
As of the census of 2000, there were 1,261 people, 563 households, and 342 families residing in the city. The racial makeup of the city was 97.07% White, 0.16% Asian, 0.63% from other races, and 2.14% from two or more races. Hispanic or Latino of any race were 1.90% of the population.

There were 563 households, out of which 27.0% had children under the age of 18 living with them, 51.3% were married couples living together, 6.2% had a female householder with no husband present, and 39.1% were non-families. 36.4% of all households were made up of individuals, and 21.0% had someone living alone who was 65 years of age or older. The average household size was 2.20 and the average family size was 2.88.

In the city, the population was spread out, with 24.3% under the age of 18, 5.1% from 18 to 24, 25.0% from 25 to 44, 21.8% from 45 to 64, and 23.9% who were 65 years of age or older. The median age was 42 years. For every 100 females, there were 96.1 males. For every 100 females age 18 and over, there were 89.5 males.

The median income for a household in the city was $33,500, and the median income for a family was $40,987. Males had a median income of $30,417 versus $19,464 for females. The per capita income for the city was $19,232. About 6.5% of families and 8.5% of the population were below the poverty line, including 8.8% of those under age 18 and 9.0% of those age 65 or over.

Education
The community is served by Dighton USD 482 public school district, which operates two schools in Dighton, the Dighton Jr/Sr High School and the Dighton Elementary School.

The Lane County Library is based in Dighton.

References

Further reading

External links

 City of Dighton
 Dighton - Directory of Public Officials
 Early Dighton photos from Wichita State University Libraries Special Collections 
 Dighton city map, KDOT

Cities in Kansas
County seats in Kansas
Cities in Lane County, Kansas